The 2022–23 Saudi Professional League (known as the Roshn Saudi League for sponsorship reasons) is the 47th edition of the Saudi Professional League, the top Saudi professional league for association football clubs, since its establishment in 1976. Fixtures for the first half of the 2022–23 season were announced on 4 August 2022.

Al-Hilal are the three-time defending champions after winning their recording extending 18th title last season. Al-Adalah, Al-Khaleej, and Al-Wehda join as the three promoted clubs from the 2021–22 Yelo League. They replaced Al-Ahli, Al-Faisaly, and Al-Hazem who were relegated to the 2022–23 Yelo League. The winner might  earn the right to play in the 2023 FIFA Club World Cup in Saudi Arabia as the host club.

Overview

Changes
On 14 April 2022, the Saudi FF announced that the number of teams in the Pro League 2023–24 season would be increased from 16 to 18 teams. To prepare for this change, only 2 teams would be relegated to the First Division League and 4 teams would be promoted to the Pro League.

Name sponsorship
On 23 August 2022, the Saudi Pro League (SPL) announced that they had signed a sponsorship deal with real estate company Roshn. As part of the sponsorship deal, the Saudi Pro League would be known as the Roshn Saudi League (RSL) for the next 5 seasons.

Teams

16 teams are competing in the league – the top 13 teams from the previous season and the 3 teams promoted from the FD League.

Teams who were promoted to the Pro League

All 3 teams were promoted on the final day of the season. Al-Khaleej were promoted and crowned champions following a 0–0 away draw with Najran. Al-Khaleej return to the top flight for the first time since getting relegated in the 2016–17 season. Al-Khaleej will play in their 8th season in the top flight.

Al-Adalah were promoted following a 0–0 draw away to Jeddah. Al-Adalah return to the top flight after an absence of two seasons. Al-Adalah will play in their 2nd season in the top flight.

Al-Wehda were promoted following a 3–0 away win against Al-Diriyah. Al-Wehda will play in the top flight of Saudi football after a season's absence. Al-Wehda will play in their 38th season in the top flight.

Teams who were relegated to the FD League

Al-Hazem were the first team to be relegated following a 5–2 defeat away to Al-Ettifaq on 21 May. Al-Hazem were relegated after just one year in the top flight. This was their second relegation in three years.

Both Al-Ahli and Al-Faisaly were relegated following on the final day of the season. Al-Ahli were relegated for the first time in their history following a 0–0 away draw with Al-Shabab. They have previously competed in every edition of the Saudi Pro League since its inception in 1976–77. This is the first edition of the Pro League in which Al-Ahli will not be featured.

Al-Faisaly were relegated following a 2–1 away defeat to Al-Hilal. Al-Faisaly were relegated after 12 consecutive seasons in the top flight.

Stadiums
Note: Table lists in alphabetical order.

Personnel and kits 

 1 On the back of the strip.
 2 On the right sleeve of the strip.
 3 On the shorts.

Managerial changes

Foreign players
The number of foreign players was increased from 7 to 8. Clubs can register a total of eight foreign players over the course of the season, but only seven could be named in the matchday squad.

Players name in bold indicates the player is registered during the mid-season transfer window.

Players in italics were out of the squad or left the club within the season, after the pre-season transfer window, or in the mid-season transfer window, and at least had one appearance.

League table

Positions by round
The following table lists the positions of teams after each week of matches. In order to preserve the chronological evolution, any postponed matches are not included to the round at which they were originally scheduled but added to the full round they were played immediately afterward. If a club from the Saudi Professional League wins the King Cup, they will qualify for the AFC Champions League, unless they have already qualified for it through their league position. In this case, an additional AFC Champions League group stage berth will be given to the 3rd placed team, and the AFC Champions League play-off round spot will be given to 4th.

Results

Season statistics

Scoring

Top goalscorers

Hat-tricks 

Note
(H) – Home; (A) – Away4 Player scored 4 goals

Most assists

Clean sheets

Discipline

Player 

 Most yellow cards: 7
 Gustavo Cuéllar (Al-Hilal)
 Bassam Al-Hurayji (Al-Batin)

 Most red cards: 2
 Fahad Al-Harbi (Al-Adalah)

Club 

 Most yellow cards: 51
 Al-Batin

 Most red cards: 4
 Al-Adalah

Attendances

By round

By team

†

†
†

Awards

Monthly awards

References

1
Saudi Professional League seasons
Saudi Professional League
Saudi Arabia, 1